St Mary's Church, Dymock is a Church of England parish church in the center  of the village of Dymock in Gloucestershire, England. It is a Grade I listed building.

History

The building is mainly Norman and is mentioned in the Domesday Book (1086 AD). The tower dates from the 15th century. The church had further Victorian restoration by John Middleton in the 19th century.

The church has been placed on the Historic England Heritage at risk register because of slow deterioration of the stonework of the tower and buttresses.

The parish is part of the benefice of Redmarley D'Abitot, Bromesberrow, Pauntley and Upleadon within the Diocese of Gloucester.

Dymock sculptors 
Dymock is celebrated as the centre of a mediaeval school of Romanesque sculpture that was first described in detail by George Zarnecki  in 1950. It was more fully analysed by the Reverend John Eric Gethyn-Jones, who renamed it after the Dymoch church which contains all of its characteristic motifs. Evidence of the work is also found in other churches within a ten-mile radius.

Architecture 

The church consists of a long 12th-century nave and a west tower dating from the 15th century, topped with a short octagonal pyramid spire. It has a south porch, and a south chapel immediately east of it. There is a north chapel not facing the south one, but further to the west. East of the nave is a 12th-century bay that was originally the lower story of a crossing tower. The tower and octagonal spire include a small octagonal stair turret and is supported by buttresses. The church includes several examples of Romanesque architecture including the doorway and windows of the nave, the stringcourse of the tower and part of the chancel wall.

The west end of the nave is devoted to a display of the Dymock poets, their work and associations. Within the church is a memorial to the men of Dymock who died in World War I and World War II.

References

Further reading 
 Crawley-Boevey A. W., The Cartulary and Historical Notes of the Cistercian Abbey of Flaxley (Exeter: Privately printed, 1887), p. 159.
 Gethyn-Jones, J. E., The Dymock School of Sculpture (London and Chichester: Phillimor, 1979). 
 Jones, J. E. G., Dymock down the Ages (1966).
 Taylor, H. M., and J. Taylor, Anglo-Saxon Architecture (1965).
 Thurlby, M., The Herefordshire School of Romanesque Sculpture (Eardisley: Logaston, 1999), pp. 20–23 and passim.
 Verey, D., Gloucestershire 2: The Vale and the Forest of Dean, The Buildings of England (Harmondsworth: Penguin, 1970; 2nd ed., 1976), pp. 175–77.
 Victoria County History: Gloucestershire XII. Online text in progress, Dymock, August 2007.
 Zarnecki, G., Regional Schools of English Sculpture in the Twelfth Century: The Southern School and the Herefordshire School. Unpublished PhD thesis, University of London, 1950, pp. 223–28.

Churches in Gloucestershire
Church of England church buildings in Gloucestershire
Grade I listed churches in Gloucestershire